Ernst Magnus Brandsten (13 June 1883 – 17 May 1965) was a Swedish diver. He competed in 3 m springboard, 10 m platform and plain high diving at the 1912 Summer Olympics and finished seventh in the last event.

After the Olympics Brandsten immigrated to the United States, where he married the Swedish diver Greta Johansson who also competed at the 1912 Olympics. The couple trained divers at the Stanford University from 1915 to 1948 and operated the sports recreation Searsville Lake Park. Their trainees dominated international diving competitions, especially at the 1924 and 1928 Olympics. They were both inducted into the International Swimming Hall of Fame: Brandsten as a diving coach in 1966 and Johansson as a diver in 1973.

See also
 List of members of the International Swimming Hall of Fame

References

1883 births
1965 deaths
Swedish male divers
Olympic divers of Sweden
Divers at the 1912 Summer Olympics
SK Neptun divers
People from Karlskoga Municipality
Sportspeople from Örebro County
20th-century Swedish people